The 2017 World Cup of Pool was the eleventh edition of the tournament. The event was held in York Hall, London, England, from 13 to 18 June. A total of 32 two-player teams participated in the tournament.

Prize fund 
A total of $250,000 constituted the prize fund.
Winners (per pair): $60,000
Runners-up (per pair): $30,000
Semi-finalists (per pair): $15,000
Quarter-finalists (per pair): $9,000
Last 16 losers (per pair): $4,500
Last 32 losers (per pair): $3,625

Competing teams

Bracket

Final 
The final was played between the United States and Austria. Austria were crowned World Cup of Pool champions after victory over USA, with a final score of 10–6.

References 

2017
2017 in cue sports
2017 sports events in London
2017 in English sport
International sports competitions in London
June 2017 sports events in the United Kingdom